Sandy Solomon (born Baltimore, Maryland) is an American poet.

Life
Solomon was raised in Baltimore, Maryland. She graduated from the University of Chicago.

She worked in Washington, DC for the National Urban Coalition and then directed two groups: the National Neighborhood Coalition and the Coalition on Human Needs.  She received an MA from Johns Hopkins University and an MFA from the Program for Writers at Warren Wilson College.  She teaches at Vanderbilt University.

Her work has appeared in The New Yorker, The New Republic, The Threepenny Review, The Gettysburg Review, The Times Literary Supplement, Ploughshares, and Partisan Review.

Her book, Pears, Lake, Sun, was published by the University of Pittsburgh Press in 1996.  She held fellowships from the Radcliffe's Bunting Institute, now the Radcliffe Institute for Advanced Study at Harvard, in 1997-8 and 1998-9.

She participated in Poets Against the War.

Awards
 1995 Agnes Lynch Starrett Poetry Prize

Works

Individual poems include:

 
 
 
 

Book:

References

External links
 "Author's Webpage"

Year of birth missing (living people)
Living people
Agnes Lynch Starrett Poetry Prize winners
Writers from Baltimore
University of Chicago alumni
Johns Hopkins University alumni
Warren Wilson College alumni
Vanderbilt University faculty
American women poets
American women academics